The first cabinet of Alexandru Vaida-Voevod was the government of Romania from 1 December 1919 to 12 March 1920.

Ministers
The ministers of the cabinet were as follows:

President of the Council of Ministers:
Alexandru Vaida-Voevod (1 December 1919 - 12 March 1920)
Minister of the Interior: 
Gen. Alexandru Averescu (5 - 16 December 1919)
(interim) Aurel Vlad (16 - 27 December 1919)
 Nicolae Lupu (27 December 1919 - 12 March 1920)
Minister of Foreign Affairs: 
Alexandru Vaida-Voevod (1 December 1919 - 12 March 1920)
Minister of Finance:
Aurel Vlad (5 December 1919 - 23 February 1920)
(interim) Mihai Popovici (23 February - 12 March 1920)
Minister of Justice:
Ion Pelivan (5 December 1919 - 12 March 1920)
Minister of Religious Affairs and Public Instruction:
Octavian Goga (5 -16 December 1919)
Ion Borcea (16 December 1919 - 12 March 1920)
Minister of War:
Gen. Ioan Rășcanu (5 December 1919 - 2 March 1920)
Gen. Traian Moșoiu (2 - 12 March 1920)
Minister of Agriculture and Property:
Victor Bontescu (5 -16 December 1919)
Ion Mihalache (16 December 1919 - 12 March 1920)
Minister of Industry and Commerce:
(interim) Aurel Vlad (5 - 16 December 1919)
Victor Bontescu (16 December 1919 - 2 March 1920)
(interim) Ion Borcea (2 - 12 March 1920)
Minister of Public Works:
Mihai Popovici (5 December 1919 - 12 March 1920)

Minister of State:
Ion Cantacuzino (5 December 1919 - 12 March 1920)

Ministers of State (for Bessarabia):
Ion Inculeț (5 December 1919 - 12 March 1920)
Pantelimon Halippa (5 December 1919 - 12 March 1920)

Minister of State (for Bukovina):
Ion Nistor (5 December 1919 - 12 March 1920)

Minister of State (for Transylvania):
Ștefan Cicio Pop (5 December 1919 - 12 March 1920)

References

Cabinets of Romania
Cabinets established in 1919
Cabinets disestablished in 1920
1919 establishments in Romania
1920 disestablishments in Romania